Kaimanawa Forest Park is a protected area south of Lake Taupo and east of Mount Tongariro in the Taupo Volcanic Zone. It is situated in the Rangitikei District and Manawatū-Whanganui Region of New Zealand's South Island.

The park is managed by the New Zealand Department of Conservation.

Geography

History

The park was established in 1969.

References

Forest parks of New Zealand
Protected areas of Manawatū-Whanganui
Rangitikei District
1969 establishments in New Zealand
Protected areas established in 1969